The eighth Tour of Flanders for Women was held on 3 April 2011 and was won by Dutch rider Annemiek van Vleuten. It was the second leg of the 2011 UCI Women's Road World Cup.

Race Summary
On the Eikenberg, only 25 riders remained in the main peloton. After 85 km Sarah Düster broke away and was later joined by Ludivine Henrion. Düster and Henrion gained up to three minutes on the peloton, in which Emma Pooley led the pursuit. Düster broke clear on the Muur van Geraardsbergen but was caught at two kilometers from the finish. Tatiana Antoshina attacked in the final kilometers, but was countered by Annemiek van Vleuten who easily beat Antoshina in a two-up sprint. Marianne Vos won the sprint for third place.

Results

References

Tour of Flanders for Women
Tour
2011 UCI Women's Road World Cup